The Mechanics and Crafts of the People of Annam (French: Technique du peuple Annamite; Vietnamese: Kỹ thuật của người An Nam,) is a multi-volume colonial manuscript created by Henri Joseph Oger (1885-1936), a colonial official who commissioned artists to record the culture of the Annamese (Vietnamese) in Hanoi and the area around it during the French colonial administration of Tonkin. The manuscript was published by Henri Joseph Oger in 1908 – 1909.

History 
Starting from 1908, Henri Joseph Oger spent his time in French Indochina doing work as an colonial volunteer until 1919. Oger first came to French Indochina as a soldier. Oger was transferred from Vinh to Hanoi where he spent three years. Oger was tasked with researching the techniques and crafts of the Vietnamese people. He had artists and woodcarvers draw and record every aspect of Vietnamese culture. Oger and the artists went through the streets of Hanoi to record statistics and draw out scenes for the manuscript. In total, approximately 4577 drawings and sketches were taken and used for the manuscript.

Due to financial and budget issues, Oger only managed to publish 60 copies of the manuscript. It was printed using woodblock printing which was a traditional method of printing in Vietnam. It is likely that the copies were printed at Vũ Thạch temple in Hàng Gai Street (present-day Bà Triệu Street in Hanoi), according to Viện Từ Diển Bách Khoa. In the second volume of the manuscript, Oger said that he setup two workshops in the temple. According to Hoa Bằng, most of Vietnam's early texts were printed in temples since most texts were often Buddhist texts.

After the French colonial period in Vietnam, only two copies remained in Vietnam. One incomplete copy is stored in the National Library of Vietnam (Vietnamese: Thư viện Quốc gia Việt Nam) in Hanoi, and the other copy which was well preserved and is currently being held at General Sciences Library of Ho Chi Minh City (Vietnamese: Thư viện Khoa học Tổng hợp Thành phố Hồ Chí Minh). 

In collaboration with École française d'Extrême-Orient (Vietnamese: Viện Viễn Đông Bác cổ Pháp) and General Sciences Library of Ho Chi Minh City, a republishing of Mechanics and Crafts of the People of Annam, was done in 2009. The republished version featured the work in three languages, French, English, and Vietnamese. In the first volume of the republished work, there is a section on the history of the manuscript and a list of illustrations with explanations in the three languages. The second and third volumes themselves contain the actual illustrations with Vietnamese captions in the Vietnamese alphabet and the former writing script of Vietnamese, chữ Nôm.

Description 
The original manuscript contained two volumes, the first volume being a compilation of more than 4200 drawings in a 700 page album. The second volume was around 160 pages. The second contains a volume titled, "Introduction générale à l’étude des techniques annamites. Essai sur la vie matérielle, les arts et industries du peuple d’Annam" (General introduction to the study of Annamite techniques. Essay on the material life, arts and industries of the Annamese people), which was a short introduction that talked about the techniques and culture of the Annamese (Vietnamese). The original manuscript included writing in Literary Chinese, Vietnamese (written in chữ Nôm), and French. Depictions were typically described in Vietnamese, written in chữ Nôm. While page numbers were written in Literary Chinese and Arabic numerals.

The contents of the manuscript shows and illustrates the culture and living conditions of the Vietnamese people in Tonkin. The illustrations range from production and manufacturing of domestic goods to cultural traditions and beliefs. These traditions also include folk games and contemporary celebrations.

Examples of subjects that were illustrated:
 Selling and buying of goods ("Selling of chopsticks"; Bán đũa, 𧸝𥮊)
 Cultural celebrations ("ritual sharing of the bridal cup of wine on the wedding night"; Lễ hợp cẩn, 禮合𢀷)
 Folk games ("Cockfighting"; Chọi cỏ gà, 𩠵𦹵𬷤)
 Everyday sights ("Areca palm trees"; Cây cau, 𣘃槁)
 Daily activities ("Squatting"; Ngồi xổm, 𡎥踮)
 Illegal activities ("Stealing cloth"; Ăn trộm khăn, 咹濫䘜)

The illustrations also accurately depict the clothing that was worn at the time, many people can be seen wearing an áo ngũ thân (5-piece dress) and an áo tứ thân (4-piece dress). Most people are also depicted wearing a traditional Vietnamese turban known as the khăn vấn. People are also depicted as being barefoot.

Gallery

See also 

 Chữ Nôm
 Vietnamese Clothing
 Tonkin (French protectorate)
 Culture of Vietnam
 History of Vietnam

Further reading 

 Intro to the Henri Oger Project: ‘On Reading a Peripheral Text’
 Wikimedia Commons - Category:Technique du peuple Annamite

Notes

References 

1908 books
Vietnamese traditions
Works about Vietnam